The list of cities in Uruguay is a list of all populated centres of Uruguay that have received the status of "Ciudad" (City). There are several populated places that have not received this status, with a population below 10,000 but as big as that of many cities. The ranks shown are only among cities and not including their wider metropolitan areas.

List 
The year given is not the year of foundation but that of the acquisition of "City" status. If this status was obtained on an unknown date before the Independence of Uruguay, the foundation year is given in parentheses, or the date it was declared a "Villa" (Town) followed by an asterisk*.

 * According to the INE, during the 2011 census, the population Paso de Carrasco and some barrios not belonging to the municipality of Ciudad de la Costa were counted as part of the city. This would bring its population to 112,447. However, Wikipedia takes the number 95,178 as the one reflecting the population of what is officially defined as "Ciudad de la Costa" and which coincides with the limits of the municipality of the same name.

Source: National Institute of Statistics of Uruguay

See also 
List of populated places in Uruguay
Municipalities of Uruguay

References

External links 

 

Uruguay, List of cities in
Uruguay
Cities